Princess Hyomyeong (1637- March 1700), was the only daughter child of Injo of Joseon, from his Consort, Royal Consort Gwi-in of the Okcheon Jo clan.

Biography
She was formally invested as a princess in her 11th year and the selection for her consort was held in the same year.  Lady Gwi-in Jo arranged for her daughter to be matched with Kim Ja-jeom’s grandson, Kim Se-ryung, and eventually they were married. She continued to live in the palace after the marriage and only left to live outside the palace two years later. King Injo cherished her deeply, resulting in her self-centered behaviour and bad relationship with her sister-in-law. After King Injo’s death, Lady Gwi-in Jo was accused of putting curses on Queen Jangryeol and King Hyojong, and Princess Hyomyeong admitted to burying unlucky things in the palace and Grand Prince Inpyeong’s residence with regard to the curse.

Although there were requests to interrogate both Princess Hyomyeong and Kim Se-ryung, only her husband was questioned, and was sentenced to death, as was his grandfather Kim Ja-jeom. She was then stripped of her title, only known as Kim Se-ryung’s wife (김세룡의 처). The princess was exiled to Tongcheon but soon relocated to Icheon since the weather in Tongcheon was cold in that year. In 1655 King Hyojong ordered for her place of exile to be moved again in order for her to live together with her siblings, Prince Sungseon and Prince Nakseon. Three years later, she was released from the sentence and continued to live under close surveillance until her death when she was 64 years old.

Family
Father: Injo of Joseon (7 December 1595 – 17 June 1649)  (조선 인조)
Grandfather: Wonjong of Joseon (2 August 1580 - 29 December 1619) (조선 원종)
Grandmother: Queen Inheon of the Neungseong Gu clan (인헌왕후 능성 구씨) (23 May 1578 - 10 February 1626)
Mother: Royal Consort Gwi-in of the Okcheon Jo clan (귀인 조씨) (1617 - 24 January 1652)
Grandfather: Jo Gi (조기, 趙琦) (1574 - ?)
Grandmother: Han Ok (한옥, 漢玉), Lady Han of the Cheongju Han clan (정부인 청주 한씨, 貞夫人 淸州 韓氏)
 Sibling(s):
 Younger brother - Yi Jing, Prince Sungseon (숭선군 징) (1639 - 1690)
 Sister-in-law - Princess Consort Yeongpung of the Pyeongsan Shin clan (영풍군부인 평산 신씨, 永豊郡夫人 平山 申氏) (1639 - 1692)
 Nephew - Yi Hang, Prince Dongpyeong (동평군 항) (1660 - 1701)
 Niece-in-law - Park Hye (박혜, 朴蕙), Princess Consort Geumseong of the Naju Park clan (금성군부인 나주 박씨) (1659 - 1727)
 Nephew - Yi Kang (동성도정 강, 東城都正 棡)
 Niece - Lady Yi of the Jeonju Yi clan (전주 이씨, 全州 李氏)
 Nephew-in-law - Yun Se-jong (윤세정, 尹世鼎) of the Haepyeong Yun clan (해평 윤씨)
 Niece - Lady Yi of the Jeonju Yi clan (전주 이씨, 全州 李氏)
 Nephew-in-law - Yun Jeong-ho (윤정호, 尹廷虎) of the Paepyeong Yun clan (파평 윤씨)
 Niece - Lady Yi of the Jeonju Yi clan (전주 이씨, 全州 李氏)
 Nephew-in-law - Ahn Su-jeong (안수정, 安壽鼎) of the Sunheung Ahn clan (순흥 안씨)
 Niece - Lady Yi of the Jeonju Yi clan (전주 이씨, 全州 李氏)
 Nephew-in-law - Jo Myeong-bong (조명봉, 趙鳴鳳) of the Yangju Jo clan (양주 조씨)
 Younger brother - Yi Suk, Prince Nakseon (낙선군 숙) (1641 - 1695)
 Sister-in-law - Princess Consort Dongwon of the Gangneung Kim clan (동원군부인 강릉 김씨, 東原君夫人 江陵 金氏) (? - 1722)
 Adoptive Nephew - Yi Hwan, Prince Imyang (임양군 이환) (1656 - 1715)
Husband: Kim Se-ryung (김세룡, 金世龍), Prince Consort Nakseong (낙성위, 洛城尉) (? - 1651)

In popular culture
Portrayed by Lee Young-eun and Lee Chae-Mi in the 2013 JTBC TV series Blooded Palace: The War of Flowers.

Notes

References

Princesses of Joseon
1636 births
1700 deaths